Mario Nahuel Quiroga (born 5 August 1991) is an Argentine professional footballer who plays as a defender for Colegiales.

Career
Quiroga started his youth career with local club Jorge Newbery de Rojas, prior to a seven-year spell with El Huracan. Further periods with San Lorenzo, Lanús and Academia Griffa followed before he joined Sarmiento in 2009; he was promoted into the senior squad soon after. In 2012, Quiroga was loaned to Torneo Argentino C's Villa Belgrano for two seasons. He returned to Primera B Nacional side Sarmiento for 2013–14, a season which yielded one goal in ten matches. In July 2014, Rosario Central signed Quiroga. Although, after not featuring in his first six months for Rosario Central, he was loaned back to Sarmiento in 2015.

Sarmiento, now an Argentine Primera División team, selected Quiroga eight times before allowing him to return to his parent club. 2016 saw him leave Rosario Central on loan again, this time joining Instituto in Primera B Nacional. Seven appearances followed in all competitions. In January 2018, Quiroga left Argentine football to play for San José of the Bolivian Primera División. He departed months later without playing, in part due to contractual issues; which later brought a lawsuit. Quiroga signed for Liga Nacional B's Industrial Avilés in July 2018. In early 2019, Quiroga joined fellow second tier team Real Tomayapo.

Quiroga went back to Argentina with Colegiales on 1 July 2019.

Career statistics
.

Honours
Rosario Central
Primera B Metropolitana: 2011–12

References

External links

1991 births
Living people
People from Rojas Partido
Argentine footballers
Association football defenders
Argentine expatriate footballers
Expatriate footballers in Bolivia
Argentine expatriate sportspeople in Bolivia
Primera B Metropolitana players
Torneo Argentino C players
Primera Nacional players
Argentine Primera División players
Bolivian Primera División players
Liga Nacional B players
Club Atlético Sarmiento footballers
Rosario Central footballers
Instituto footballers
Club San José players
Club Atlético Colegiales (Argentina) players
Sportspeople from Buenos Aires Province